Clarence Brooks may refer to:

 Clarence Brooks (American football) (1951–2016), American football coach
 Clarence Brooks (actor) (1896–1969), American actor